Wheat is a color that resembles the light yellow of the wheat grain.

The first recorded use of wheat as a color name in English was in 1711.

Wheat is one of the X11 web colors.

References

See also
List of colors

Shades of brown
Wheat